Ubi or UBI may refer to:

Organizations 
 Ubisoft (Euronext: UBI), a video game publisher and developer
 União Brasileira pro Interlingua, the national Interlingua organization in Brazil, see Brazilian Union for Interlingua
 University of Beira Interior, a Portuguese public university
 Union Bank of India, one of India's largest state-run banks, inaugurated by Mahatma Gandhi
 United Bank of India, a major commercial bank in India, nationalised in 1969
 United Bicycle Institute, a bicycle mechanics and frame building school in Oregon, US
 UBI Banca (Unione di Banche Italiane), an Italian bank
 United Barcode Industries, a Swedish company acquired by Intermec in 1997
United Business Institutes, a private business school in Brussels

People 
 Ubi Dwyer (1933–2001), founder of the Windsor Free Festival
 Ubi (formerly Ubiquitous), member of Kansas City rap duo Ces Cru

Other 
 Kampong Ubi, also known as Ubi Estate, a residential and industrial area in Singapore
 Ubi language, an Afro-Asiatic language spoken in Central Chad
 Universal basic income, an unconditional, non-means tested social dividend
 Unsorted Block Images, a block management layer for flash memory devices, often used in conjunction with UBI File System
 Upu, a historic region surrounding Damascus (alternative transliteration)
 Usage-based insurance, a method of variable payment for auto insurance based on usage data

See also 
 Dioscorea alata (some Malayo-Polynesian languages: ubi), a vegetable of the yam family
 Oobi (disambiguation)